Rio Negro is a container ship owned by A.P. Moller Singapore Pte. Ltd. and operated by Maersk Line AS. Originally owned by Rio Negro GmbH & Co KG, a subsidiary of Hamburg Süd, she has had two owners and been registered under two flags.

The vessel is one of three ships of the Rio class built for Hamburg Süd by Daewoo Shipbuilding & Marine Engineering in 2008.

Construction
Rio Negro had its keel laid down on 16 June 2008 at Daewoo Shipbuilding & Marine Engineering in Okpo, South Korea.

The ship's gross tonnage, a measure of the volume of all its enclosed spaces, is 73,899. Its net tonnage, which measures the volume of the cargo spaces, is 39,673.

The vessel was built with a Hyundai Heavy Industries Engine and Machinery Division 8RTA96C main engine, which drives a controllable-pitch propeller. The 8-cylinder engine has a Maximum Continuous Rating of 45,760 kW with 102 revolutions per minute at MCR. The cylinder bore is 960mm. The vessel's steam piping system features an Aalborg CH 8-4500 auxiliary boiler, as well as an Aalborg AQ-2 exhaust gas boiler.

Construction of the ship was completed on 4 November 2008.

Notes

Merchant ships
2008 ships